Cheeseekau (c. 1760–1792) was a war chief of the Kispoko division of the Shawnee Nation. Also known as Pepquannakek (Gunshot), Popoquan (Gun), Sting, and Chiksika. Although primarily remembered as the eldest brother and mentor of Tecumseh, who became famous after Cheeseekau's death, Cheeseekau was a well-known leader in his own time, and a contemporary of Blue Jacket.

Few details are known about Cheeseekau's early life. He may have been born along the Tallapoosa River in what is now Alabama. His parents, Puckeshinwa and Methoataaskee, moved north to the Ohio Country around the time of his birth. After Pukeshinwa's death in the Battle of Point Pleasant in 1774, Cheeseekau assumed much of the responsibility for his younger brothers, including Tecumseh and Tenskwatawa.

During the American Revolutionary War (1775–1783), Cheeseekau joined with those Shawnees who allied themselves with the British and sought to drive the American settlers out of Kentucky. After the war, as Americans expanded into Ohio, in 1788 Cheeseekau led a group of Shawnees to Missouri. American colonists were moving to Missouri too, and Cheeseekau resettled his band at the village of Running Water on the Tennessee River, where he joined Dragging Canoe's militant Chickamauga Cherokee in fighting American expansion. He died On October 1, 1792 after being mortally wounded during an attack on Bledsoe's Station, a frontier fort near Nashville, TN.

Notes

Sources
Brown, John P.  Old Frontiers: The Story of the Cherokee Indians from Earliest Times to the Date of Their Removal to the West, 1838. (Kingsport: Southern Publishers, 1938).
Eckert, Allan W.  A Sorrow in Our Heart: The Life of Tecumseh.  (New York: Bantam, 1992).
Sugden, John. Tecumseh: A Life. New York: Holt, 1997.  (hardcover);  (1999 paperback).
Sugden, John. "Cheeseekau". American National Biography. 4:767–68. Ed. John A. Garraty and Mark C. Carnes. New York: Oxford University Press, 1999. .

1760 births
1792 deaths
Native Americans in the American Revolution
Native American people of the Indian Wars
Chickamauga Cherokee
18th-century Shawnee people
Native American leaders